Smujji is a British reggae/dancehall singer.

He appeared on FYA's 2004 single "Must Be Love" which was a No. 13 hit on the UK Singles Chart. His own single, "K.O.", reached No. 43 in the UK. Together with FYA, he appeared as part of Bliss magazine's 2004 Rock and Shop tour. He was also a support act for American musician Usher in the Truth Tour.

Smujji's debut album, True Colours was released in 2005 on Jamdown UK and Reservoir Records (Japan). A solo version of "Must Be Love" by Smujji appears on the album.

Discography

Albums
True Colours (2005), Jamdown/Reservoir
Ghetto Silk (2007), Jamdown
Ultimate Smujji (compilation) (2013), Jamdown

Singles
2004: "Must Be Love" (with FYA) – UK No. 13
2004: "K.O." – UK No. 43
2005: "Waiting for a Girl Like You"
2006: "Let Yourself Go"
2006: "Hol 'Em High" (with Busy Signal)
2007: "Take It Off" (with Ce'cile)

References

External links

Date of birth missing (living people)
Living people
British dancehall musicians
British reggae singers
21st-century Black British male singers
Year of birth missing (living people)